The Liberation of Skopje is an Australian television film released in on 9 April 1981 in Serbo-Croatian language. It is also known as Oslobodenje Skoplja or KPGT which is about the liberation of Skopje prison.

Plot
Zoran is an eight-year-old boy who sees the German occupy Skopje, Vardar Macedonia in 1942. His father Dushan is a member of the partisan forces and his uncle, Georgij plays a part in the assassination of a high ranking German officer, as well as in the evacuation and transport of Jews to the free territories.

Cast 

 Rade Serbedzija as Georgij Potevski
 Sasa Kuzmanovic as Zoran
 Inge Appelt as Lence
 Miljenko Brlecic as Bale
 Ratko Buljan as Doktor
 Darko Curdo as Chief Bulgarian Police
 Antonia Cutic as Ana
 Tone Gogala as Stojcev
 Dragoljub Lazarov as Gospodinov

Production
It was based on a Yugoslavian play of the same name which won the 28th Annual Village Voice 1983 Obie Award for Special Citations Off Broadway in New York and toured Australia in 1980. The film was produced by Ferryman Television with an estimated production budget of 100,000 AUD. Scenes were shot in locations such as Sydney and New South Wales.

See also 
 Capture of Skopje (1944)

References

External links

The Liberation of Skopje at Macedonian Film Fund

Australian television films
1981 television films
1981 films